"Maybe This Time" is a song written by John Kander and Fred Ebb for actress Kaye Ballard. It was later included in the 1972 film Cabaret, where it is sung by the character Sally Bowles, played by Liza Minnelli. It had already been recorded and released twice, in similar arrangements, on Minnelli's debut studio album Liza! Liza! (1964), and subsequently New Feelin' (1970), but it turned into a traditional pop standard after its 1972 inclusion in Cabaret.

Production
Though originally written in 1964 for a different purpose, the song was put into the 1972 film version of the 1966 Cabaret musical. This is one of "two numbers that were added only in 1998, after they were used in the movie", along with "Mein Herr".

Analysis
The Telegraph explained that the song should have an air of "desperate hope" and that Bowles should feel like "someone teetering on the edge of despair." Talkin' Broadway said Maybe this Time' serving as Sally's internal monologue in response to Cliff's plea", adding that the song "is the only time we see the real person beneath the frivolous girl for whom life is a neverending party (cabaret, whatever). As we're privy to Sally's unspoken thoughts here". What's On in Cape Town described Sally Bowles as a Manic Pixie Dream Girl, writing "Her iconic solo, 'Maybe This Time', can be considered the MPDG theme song." Bowles "believ[es] she may be in love for the first time".

Critical reception
The song has been described as a "wistful", and "heartbreaking". Lincolnshire Review described the song as a "soaring ballad", and Peterborough Telegraph deemed it "hopeful".

References

1972 songs
Liza Minnelli songs
Songs from Cabaret (musical)
Songs with lyrics by Fred Ebb
Songs with music by John Kander
1970s ballads